Fatima Lami Abubakar   (born 12 April 1951) is a Nigerian jurist who was the First Lady of Nigeria during the term of Abdulsalami Abubakar from June 1998 to May 1999. After her reign as First Lady, Abubakar was the Chief Judge of Niger State from 2013 to 2016.

Early life and education
Fatima Lami was born on 12 April 1951 in Minna, Nigeria, and completed her high-school education at Queen Elizabeth School in Ilorin Kwara. She went to college in Ilorin before going to the Federal Government College, Sokoto, and University of Ife. In her post-secondary studies, she completed multiple degrees in law, ranging from a bachelor's degree to a Doctor of Philosophy. Abubakar also completed additional schooling at the Nigeria Law School. She is the first Nigerian First Lady to have graduated from university.

Career
Abubakar began her career in law as an inspector and senior counsel in Nigeria. She was named the solicitor general of the Niger State Ministry of Justice in 1985 and a judge for the High Court in 1989. In March 2013, Abubakar was named the Chief Judge of Niger State. She held this position until her retirement in April 2016.

Outside of her career in law, Abubakar was a part of a constituent assembly from 1988 to 1989 and a bank fraud committee from 1989 to 1992. In June 1998, Abubakar became the First Lady of Nigeria after her husband Abdulsalami Abubakar assumed office of President of Nigeria. Her reign as First Lady ended in May 1999. During her term as First Lady, Abubakar founded the Women's Rights Advancement and Protection Alternative in 1999, which focuses on women's human rights. She was conferred with SIr Ahmadu Bellow Honours Award for her outstanding service to humanity, advocacy on child rights and prison congestion by the Sir Ahmadu Bello Memorial Foundation in Kaduna.

Personal life
Abubakar is married to former President of Nigeria Abdulsalami Abubakar, with whom she has six children.

Bibliography 
 Kabir, Hajara Muhammad,. Northern women development. [Nigeria]. . .

References

1951 births
First Ladies of Nigeria
Living people
Obafemi Awolowo University alumni
20th-century Nigerian women
20th-century Nigerian lawyers
Nigerian women judges